Herbert Gladstone Coe Gibbons (12 March 1905 – 13 January 1963) was an English first-class cricketer. A right-handed batsman who bowled leg break and googly, he made his debut for Hampshire against Warwickshire in the 1925 County Championship.

From 1925 to 1928 Gibbons represented Hampshire in seven first-class matches, with Gibbons final first-class appearance for Hampshire coming against Nottinghamshire. In his seven matches, Bodington scored 70 runs at an average of 10.00, with a high score of 27. With the ball Gibbons failed to take a wicket.

Gibbons died at Southampton, Hampshire on 13 January 1963.

External links
Herbert Gibbons at Cricinfo
Herbert Gibbons at CricketArchive

1905 births
1963 deaths
People from Tilehurst
English cricketers
Hampshire cricketers